Joseph Leroy Organ (July 12, 1891 – July 23, 1966) was an American track and field athlete who competed in the 1920 Summer Olympics. He was born in Rush Township, Champaign County, Ohio and died in Saint Joseph, Missouri. In 1920 he finished seventh in the Olympic marathon competition.

References

External links
list of American athletes

1891 births
1966 deaths
American male long-distance runners
Olympic track and field athletes of the United States
Athletes (track and field) at the 1920 Summer Olympics
American male marathon runners
20th-century American people